Håkon Gundersen (18 September 1907 – 26 December 1986) was a Norwegian footballer. He played in two matches for the Norway national football team from 1936 to 1937. He was also part of Norway's squad for the football tournament at the 1936 Summer Olympics, but he did not play in any matches.

References

External links
 

1907 births
1986 deaths
Norwegian footballers
Norway international footballers
Place of birth missing
Association football goalkeepers
Frigg Oslo FK players